is a Japanese football player. He plays for Kamatamare Sanuki.

Career
Takuya Nagasawa joined Japanese Regional Leagues club Artista Tomi in 2012. In 2013, he entered Ryukoku University. In 2017, he joined J2 League club Kamatamare Sanuki.

Club statistics
Updated to 22 February 2018.

References

External links
Profile at Kamatamare Sanuki

1993 births
Living people
Ryukoku University alumni
Association football people from Nagano Prefecture
Japanese footballers
J2 League players
Kamatamare Sanuki players
Association football defenders